The 1977 Dallas Cowboys season was their 18th in the National Football League (NFL). The club appeared twice on Monday Night Football. Rookie running back Tony Dorsett rushed for 1,007 yards and became the second member of the Cowboys (first since 1973) to have a 1,000-yard rushing season. Dallas scored 345 points, which ranked first in the NFC, while its defense only gave up 212 points. The Cowboys made it to their fourth Super Bowl and beat the Denver Broncos to capture their second Super Bowl title. They were the first team from the NFC East Division to win two Super Bowls. Their  record (including the postseason) remains the highest single-season winning percentage in franchise history.

As in 1975, the Cowboys did not play this season on Thanksgiving, again replaced by the St. Louis Cardinals.

The 1977 Cowboys ranked #17 on the 100 greatest teams of all time presented by the NFL on its 100th anniversary.

Offseason
To improve their running game, the Cowboys orchestrated a big trade with the Seattle Seahawks, moving up in the NFL draft to acquire running back Tony Dorsett, the Heisman Trophy winner from national champion Pittsburgh.

With the retirement of Lee Roy Jordan, Bob Breunig became the starting middle linebacker, Randy White was moved to defensive tackle, and Thomas Henderson became a starter at strongside linebacker, turning the defense into a dominant unit.

Draft

Preseason

Regular season 
 December 4, 1977 – Tony Dorsett becomes the first player in franchise history to rush for at least 200 yards in a game. Against the Philadelphia Eagles, Dorsett had 23 rushes for 206 yards and 2 touchdowns including an 84-yard touchdown run which was the longest during the 1977 NFL Season.

Schedule

Division opponents are in bold text

Standings

Roster

Game Summaries

Week 1: at Minnesota Vikings

Week 2: vs. New York Giants

Week 3: vs. Tampa Bay Buccaneers

Week 4: at St. Louis Cardinals

Week 5: vs. Washington Redskins

Week 6: at Philadelphia Eagles

Week 7: vs. Detroit Lions

Week 8: at New York Giants

Week 9: vs. St. Louis Cardinals

Week 10: at Pittsburgh Steelers

Week 11: at Washington Redskins

Week 12: vs. Philadelphia Eagles

Week 13: at San Francisco 49ers

Week 14: vs. Denver Broncos

Postseason

NFC Divisional Playoff

NFC Championship Game

Super Bowl XII

Season recap
With an improved offense and defense, the Cowboys finished with a 12-2 regular season record, breezing through the playoffs by beating the Chicago Bears 37–7 in the divisional round, defeating the Minnesota Vikings 23–6 in the NFC Championship Game and winning Super Bowl XII 27–10 against the Denver Broncos.

Dorsett set a franchise rookie record with 1,007 rushing yards. Defensive end Harvey Martin had one of the greatest seasons ever by an NFL player. In a 14-game season he totaled 85 tackles and an estimated league-leading 23 sacks (more than Michael Strahan's 22.5 record in 16 games), he was named the NFL Defensive Player of the Year, a consensus All-Pro selection, was a key player in the Cowboys winning Super Bowl XII, and a co-MVP of the game with Randy White.

Awards and Records
 Tony Dorsett, NFL Offensive Rookie of the Year Award
 Tony Dorsett, All-Pro Selection
 Efrén Herrera, Five Field Goals Attempted in one Super Bowl game, Super Bowl record
 Harvey Martin, Super Bowl Most Valuable Player
 Harvey Martin, NFL Defensive Player of the Year
 Harvey Martin, Led NFL, Sacks (23)
 Drew Pearson, Led NFL Receiving Yards (870)
 Drew Pearson, All-Pro Selection
 Drew Pearson, Pro Bowl Selection
 Roger Staubach, All-Pro Selection
 Roger Staubach, Pro Bowl Selection
 Roger Staubach, Led NFC, Touchdown Passes (18)
 Roger Staubach, NFC Passing Leader
 Randy White, Super Bowl Most Valuable Player
 Led NFC, Points Scored (345)
 Led NFC, Fewest Rushing Yards Allowed (1,651)
 Led NFL, Fewest Total Yards Allowed (3,213)
 Led NFL, Total Yards, (4,812)

Publications
 The Football Encyclopedia 
 Total Football 
 Cowboys Have Always Been My Heroes

References

External links
 1977 Dallas Cowboys
 Pro Football Hall of Fame
 Dallas Cowboys Official Site

§

Dallas
Dallas Cowboys seasons
NFC East championship seasons
National Football Conference championship seasons
Super Bowl champion seasons
Dallas Cowboys